Bukit Batok Town Park is a nature park located in the precinct of Guilin in the town of Bukit Batok, Singapore. The park was created from a disused granite quarry. As such, it has a resemblance to the granite rock formations in Guilin, China. Hence it is also known as Little Guilin or Xiao Guilin among the Chinese.

History
Together with the neighbouring Bukit Batok Nature Park, Bukit Batok Town Park occupies 77 hectares of land in Bukit Batok planning area, which covers the subzones Bukit Gombak, Hong Kah, Brickworks and Hillview. The park was a granite quarry for extracting a form of norite called Gombak norite. The name of the area, Bukit Batok, which means "coughing hills", was derived from the sounds of quarrying activities.

When the granite had to be extracted below sea level and could threaten the ecology of the area, the government closed down the quarries in Bukit Batok and made arrangements to purchase granite from Indonesia instead. As a result, the quarry became abandoned and rainwater filled it up over time, turning it into a mini lake. In 1984, the Housing and Development Board (HDB) wanted to fill up the quarry and build a road over it. However, after seeing that the existing quarry had rugged granite outcrops and a contrasting backdrop of green hills that gave it a pleasant look, the HDB converted the quarry into a park instead. They also beautified the surroundings and improved accessibility by placing granite blocks on the retaining walls, as well as adding footpaths, lights and seating. The park was called "Little Guilin" or "Xiao Guilin" by the locals because the granite formations resemble the mountains in Guilin in China's Guangxi Province.

In 1996, the Urban Redevelopment Authority linked the Town Park and Nature Parks via park connectors to the Bukit Timah Nature Reserve and Sungei Pandan to enhance the residential landscape for the area around Yishun and Bukit Batok.

The park is located in Bukit Gombak, at Bukit Batok East Avenue 5, and is a five-minute walk from Bukit Gombak MRT station. Besides being used for exercise and walks, the park has also been used as a stage for Chinese opera, dance and music performances. The park has also been suggested as an alternative destination for tourists wishing to see a different side of Singapore.

Urban legends in Singapore say that the park is haunted by the spirits of those who died in accidents while working at the quarry or drowned in the lake.

Construction
The 42-hectare park has two dome-shaped shelters for protection against sun or rain.

This park is divided in 3 parts:
 The left side part (as viewed from Bukit Batok East Ave 5) is a bank to the lake and comprises trees, grass plains and stone seats. This part featured a nature trekking track in the trees behind the lake, but is closed off now.
 The middle part has one shelter with stone benches to sit and several stone seats.
 The right side part also has a similar shelter and stone seats. A bus stop is just next to this part of the park.

The middle and right side part are located just behind the road (Bukit Batok East Ave 5). These parts are built as retaining walls for the lake.
The left side part is not connected to the other parts and is accessible by the roadside. The middle and right side are connected internally by a small path and these two parts are also accessible by the roadside.

This park is a favourite spot with shutter bugs intending upon Nature Photography, Anglers fishing in the lake, picnickers and joggers.

Bukit Gombak Trail 
Part of the Little Guilin Park, the Bukit Gombak Trail was created through the national Parks Board's Adopt-A-Park Scheme with the former Sembawang-Hong Kah Community Development Council and Bukit Gombak Community Club Youth Executive committee in 1999. It was a nature walk through the park, with directional signposts located at several points. According to the National Parks Board, these lookout points offered magnificent aerial perspectives of the lake and a bird's eye view of the surrounding estate.
In 2007, following landslides, the National Parks Board permanently closed the trail.

Getting there
 The park is 5 minutes' walk from Bukit Gombak MRT station.
Tower Transit Singapore operates feeder bus service number 945 operating from Bukit Batok Bus Interchange at looping at Bukit Batok Street 34.

Gallery

See also
List of Parks in Singapore
Bukit Batok Nature Park

References

External links

National Parks Board, Singapore
Bukit Batok Town Park

Bukit Batok
Parks in Singapore